Gonospira uvula is a species of small air-breathing land snail, terrestrial pulmonate gastropod mollusk in the family Streptaxidae.

Distribution
This species is endemic to Réunion.

References

 Griffiths, O.L. & Florens, V.F.B. (2006). A field guide to the non-marine molluscs of the Mascarene Islands (Mauritius, Rodrigues and Réunion) and the northern dependencies of Mauritius. Bioculture Press: Mauritius. Pp. i–xv, 1–185.

External links
 Deshayes, G. P. (1863). Catalogue des mollusques de l'île de la Réunion (Bourbon). Pp. 1-144. In Maillard, L. (Ed.) Notes sur l'Ile de la Réunion. Dentu, Paris
 Crosse, H. (1863). Diagnoses d'espèces nouvelles. Journal de Conchyliologie. 11(4): 388–389. 

Gonospira
Gastropods described in 1863
Taxonomy articles created by Polbot